Elvira Weisenberger (born 24 December 1949) is an Argentine former professional tennis player.

Biography
A right-handed player, Weisenberger competed in 12 Federation Cup ties for Argentina, from 1973 to 1977.

Her best grand slam performance was a third round appearance at the 1974 French Open, beating Lindsay Blachford and Mariana Simionescu.

Weisenberger, who lives in Buenos Aires, is a former president of the Women's International Tennis Association (WITA), an organisation which ran parallel to the WTA in the 1970s.

See also
List of Argentina Fed Cup team representatives

References

External links
 
 
 

1949 births
Living people
Argentine female tennis players
20th-century Argentine women